Ro-48 was an Imperial Japanese Navy Kaichū type submarine of the K6 sub-class. Completed and commissioned in March 1944, she served in World War II and was sunk in July 1944 during her first war patrol.

Design and description
The submarines of the K6 sub-class were versions of the preceding K5 sub-class with greater range and diving depth. They displaced  surfaced and  submerged.

For surface running, the boats were powered by two  diesel engines, each driving one propeller shaft. When submerged each propeller was driven by a  electric motor. They could reach  on the surface and  underwater.

The boats were armed with four internal bow  torpedo tubes and carried a total of ten torpedoes. They were also armed with a single  L/40 anti-aircraft gun and two single  AA guns.

Construction and commissioning

Ro-48 was laid down at Submarine No. 389 on 17 March 1943 by Mitsubishi at Kobe, Japan. She was renamed Ro-48 on 31 July 1943 and was attached provisionally to the Maizuru Naval District that day. Launched on 15 October 1943, she was completed and commissioned on 31 March 1944. She was completed with a radar detector installed and a modified conning tower designed to be less visible to radar signals.

Service history

March–July 1944
Upon commissioning, Ro-48 was attached formally to the Maizuru Naval District and assigned to Submarine Squadron 11 for workups. She was reassigned to Submarine Division 34 in the 6th Fleet on 3 July 1944.

First war patrol

On 13 June 1944 the Combined Fleet activated Operation A-Go for the defense of the Mariana Islands, and the Battle of Saipan began with U.S. landings on Saipan on 15 June 1944. On 5 July 1944, Ro-48 departed Kure, Japan, to begin her first war patrol, assigned a patrol area in the Marianas off Saipan. She arrived in her patrol area, within  of Saipan, on 12 July 1944, and that date received orders to stand by to rescue Imperial Japanese Navy Air Service pilots stranded on Tinian. On 16 July 1944, 6th Fleet headquarters ordered Ro-48 to return to Japan.

Loss

At 00:24 on 19 July 1944, two destroyer escorts —  and  — detached from the Hoggatt Bay group to investigate. She fired a barrage of 24 Hedgehog projectiles at 00:51, but did not score a hit. Wyman then opened the range to reload before closing for another attack, and fired a second 24-projectile Hedgehog barrage at 01:25. Five underwater explosions that shook Wyman ensued as the Hedgehog projectiles struck the  submarine and tore it apart.

The submarine Wyman sank probably was Ro-48. On 10 July 1944, the Imperial Japanese Navy declared Ro-48 to be presumed lost off Saipan with all 76 men on board. She was stricken from the Navy list on 10 October 1944.

Some sources have credited the fast transport  and the destroyer escort  with sinking Ro-48 on 14 July 1944, but the Japanese submarine they sank was probably .

Notes

References
 

 

Ro-35-class submarines
Kaichū type submarines
Ships built by Mitsubishi Heavy Industries
1943 ships
World War II submarines of Japan
Japanese submarines lost during World War II
World War II shipwrecks in the Pacific Ocean
Maritime incidents in July 1944
Ships lost with all hands
Submarines sunk by United States warships